"Whenever, Wherever" is a song by Colombian singer-songwriter Shakira from her fifth studio album and English-language debut, Laundry Service (2001). It was released on 2 October 2001 by Epic Records as the lead single from the album. The song was written, composed, and produced by Shakira, with additional musical composition and production from Tim Mitchell, and additional lyrics written by Gloria Estefan in the English-language version. "Whenever, Wherever" is a mix of Latin music and worldbeat that is heavily influenced by Andean music. The Spanish version of the song, titled "Suerte" (English: "Luck"), lyrically discusses how fortunate Shakira is to have found her romantic partner.

Upon its release, "Whenever, Wherever" received generally favorable reviews from music critics, who complimented its production. The song became her breakthrough hit in the United States, peaking at number six on the Billboard Hot 100. In doing so, it became her most successful single in the country, though it was eventually surpassed after "Hips Don't Lie" peaked at number one on the chart in 2006. The selection, additionally, topped charts in 29 countries, including her native Colombia and the majority of Latin America, Europe, Middle East and Oceania. It is recognized as one of Shakira's signature songs, and was one of the most successful songs in the world in 2002. Globally, it has sold over 8.5 million copies.

Background and release 
After the 1998 release of her second major album, ¿Dónde Están los Ladrones?, achieved major success, Shakira released her first live album, MTV Unplugged: Shakira, in 2000. However, Shakira wanted a breakthrough in America and the world with songs in English. Shakira explained:  Then, "Whenever, Wherever" was released as her debut English single on 27 September 2001. At the same time, she also released the selection's Spanish version, titled "Suerte", meaning "Luck", for Spanish markets.

Composition
The lyrics of the song were initially conceived in Spanish and were written by Shakira on her own. Later on, additional co-writing credits by Cuban-born American singer Gloria Estefan were added for the English-language version.  The song was arranged and produced by Shakira and Tim Mitchell. Sonically, the song is a mix of Latin music and worldbeat, with distinctive Latin instruments like the Charango and Quena Flute. "Whenever, Wherever" is composed in the key of C# minor. The song is heavily influenced by Andean music, and includes the charango and panpipes in its instrumentation.

Lyrically, "Whenever, Wherever" talks about fate and how it has played a major role in Shakira's romance. It starts with a guitar, similar to the 4-note riff from Pink Floyd's "Shine On, You Crazy Diamond," leading, beginning with baritone-range panpipes, to the explosive melody. Then, Shakira talks that she would follow her boyfriend to the top of the highest mountain, risking life and limb to be intimate with him. In the chorus, she sings, "Whenever, wherever/We're meant to be together/I'll be there and you'll be near/And that's the deal my dear."

Critical reception
"Whenever, Wherever" received mainly positive reviews from music critics. Alex Henderson of AllMusic picked the song as a highlight, writing that it's "infectious" and "it's to Shakira what 'Livin' la Vida Loca' was to Ricky Martin: the major hit that brought her to English-speaking audiences in a big way." Lisa Oliver of Yahoo! Music called it "the top track from the album by miles," writing that, "Despite such bemusement-inducing lyrics as 'lucky that my breasts are small and humble so you don't confuse them with mountains,' it still manages to make you sit up and fancy the synthetic-fiber trousers off her." The phrase was praised by The Guardians Alexis Petridis, who called it "the most thought-provoking line of recent memory". The website Bland Is Out There also enjoyed the phrase, writing that "it's the most clever, self-confident couplet to hit radio in the long time." The review also wrote that the Spanish version, "Suerte", was far superior, explaining, "In English, Shakira's vocals are breathy and nasal. But in her native tongue, she's commanding and willowy." For David Browne of Entertainment Weekly, the song has a "shameless Latin-pop hook".

In 2020, Billboard included Whenever, Wherever among the 50 best Latin songs of all time, stating that "with its touches of South American folklore married to a rousing, unforgettable chorus and a danceable beat, "Whenever, Wherever" is still an anthem for love that knows no boundaries."

 Commercial performance 

"Whenever, Wherever" was Shakira's most successful single at the time, which it stayed until "Hips Don't Lie" was released in five years. In the United States, "Whenever, Wherever" debuted at number 76 on the Billboard Hot 100 chart, while it peaked at number 6. In doing so, it became her first top 10 single on the chart. Additionally, the track respectively peaked at numbers 1, 3, and 4 on the Billboard Hot Latin Tracks, Latin Pop Airplay, Hot Dance Club Play, and Top 40 Tracks component charts. In Canada, the song peaked at number 4. According to Sony Music Canada, the song has sold over 2 million copies in the United States. In Australia, the song debuted at number 1, on 10 February 2002, remaining at the top for six weeks. In New Zealand, the song debuted at number 39 on the RIANZ chart, on 20 January 2002, while it reached the number-1 spot in its fourth week. It spent 8 non-consecutive weeks at the top, becoming her highest-charting single.

In Europe, "Whenever, Wherever" became a major success, topping the charts of more than 15 countries, quickly establishing Shakira's presence in the European mainstream. In the United Kingdom, the song became Shakira's first top three hit on the UK Singles Chart, peaking at number two for two consecutive weeks, and eventually spent ten weeks in the top 10 of the chart, as well as 19 weeks in the top 75. The song currently stands as the seventh bestselling song by a female artist in the 21st century in the United Kingdom. It is also the 38th bestselling single of the 2000s decade in the UK. In Austria, the song remained at the top for seven weeks, while in France, it remained for four weeks. In Italy, the song debuted at number 1, staying at the top for one further week. Later, it fell to number 4, climbed to number 2 and reached the top again. Later, it fell to number 2 and attained the top once again. Later, the song fell to number 2 and climbed to number 1, where it remained for two further weeks, spending seven non-consecutive weeks at the top, and becoming the best-selling single of 2002. In Switzerland, the song debuted at number 9 on the singles chart, and the following week, it reached the number-one position, where it remained for a total of seventeen consecutive weeks, becoming the 22nd most successful song of the decade in that country. Topping the charts for 17 weeks, it also set a record in being the longest time on the number one spot in the country. In February 2014 "Whenever, Wherever" entered the UK Singles Chart again at number 99.

The Spanish version of the song, "Suerte", also written and produced by Shakira and Mitchell, was released as a single in Spain, Mexico as well as in several countries in South America. It too became a huge hit, peaking at number 1 on Billboard's Hot Latin Tracks chart for seven non-consecutive weeks and remained within the top 10 of the chart for over four months. It also topped the charts in almost all of the Spanish-speaking countries where it was released.

In 2020 Billboard revealed that "Suerte" was the 16th most successful Latin song of all time on the Hot Latin Songs.

Resurgence in 2020
Following Shakira's Super Bowl LIV halftime show performance co-headlined with American singer Jennifer Lopez, "Whenever, Wherever" became the highest-selling song performed at the Super Bowl halftime show with 4,000 digital downloads on the first day up by 1,264%. The following week, the song became the highest-charting song performed at the Super Bowl halftime show on Billboard Digital Song Sales chart, peaking at number 4. The same week the Spanish version of the song, "Suerte", topped Billboard Latin Digital Songs chart.

Music video

The music video was directed by Francis Lawrence in front of a blue screen, and features Shakira surrounded by Earth's natural wonders. It begins with her submerged in the ocean, the only part of the video that is not shot on a blue screen; the underwater part is real as her hair is flowing freely and she is blowing soft bubbles from her nose and mouth. She leaps out of the water onto the surrounding rocks and observing a landscape of mountains; a falcon flies down towards her.

Shakira then proceeds to walk barefoot into the desert while belly-dancing, where she is soon seen dancing amid a stampede of horses. The stampede suddenly stops, and she kneels into a shallow pool of mud, and begins crawling through it. As the video nears its conclusion, she is on top of a snowy mountain before jumping off, descending into water and submerging herself once more, as the video comes full circle. The video was shot twice, the other version being for "Suerte"/"Luck", with Lawrence directing both versions.

The video became an instant hit on several music programs. It became Shakira's first video to retire on MTV's TRL, and in Canada, reached number one for a single week on the MuchMusic program Countdown. It won the 2002 Latin Grammy Award for "Best Short Form Music Video". There are 2 remix videos using the Tracy Young Spin Cycle Mix and the Tracy Young Tribal Mix.

In 2018, Billboard included "Whenever, Wherever" among the 100 greatest music videos of the 21st century, stating that it "introduced Shakira's swiveling hips to the world", and that its "minimalist production, which memorably featured Shakira dancing alone without props, musicians or other dancers, was enough to catapult her to international stardom."

Other versions and live performances
Shakira recorded a studio recording of the live version of "Whenever, Wherever", which was used for television performances, for both the English and Spanish versions of the song. It was called the "TV Edit". She sang the original CD version only once, on the 2001 Radio Music Awards, where she performed the song live for the first time. A remix of the song was included on the re-release of Laundry Service, Laundry Service: Washed & Dried. This was titled the "Sahara Mix", and was completely transformed from the original version, instead being given a heavy Middle Eastern feel. For her world tour, the Tour of the Mongoose, Shakira took the drums that begin the "Sahara Mix" and incorporated them into an intro for the original version of "Whenever, Wherever/Suerte", which extended the amount of time Shakira had to interact with the audience. She also included the same intro for "Whenever, Wherever/Suerte" for her second world tour, the Oral Fixation Tour. However, for this tour, she danced to the drums with a rope, as opposed to dancing with a candelabra on her head as she did during the Tour of the Mongoose. To promote the DVD Live & Off the Record, Shakira used the song as a second single, editing the original live version to a radio edit version and video edit version, which was included in the "Poem to a Horse" promo. During The Sun Comes Out World Tour, Shakira gave the song a more rock-oriented sound, mixed it with a cover of the English band EMF's "Unbelievable", and brought select men and women from the audience on stage for a short dance lesson.

The song was performed by Shakira during the Super Bowl LIV halftime show. Following that performance, the song went number one on the iTunes singles chart.

Track listings
 Japanese single (EICP 53) "Whenever, Wherever" – 3:17
 "Objection (Tango)" – 3:43
 European single (671913 3) "Whenever, Wherever" – 3:16
 "Suerte" – 3:14
 "Suerte" European single (671913 9) "Suerte (Whenever, Wherever)" – 3:14
 "Whenever, Wherever" – 3:16
 Australia (672196 2) "Whenever, Wherever" – 3:16
 "Suerte (Whenever, Whenever)" – 3:14
 "Whenever, Wherever" (TV edit) – 3:39
 "Inevitable" – 3:13
 Europe (671913 8) "Whenever, Wherever" (album version) – 3:16
 "Whenever, Wherever" (TV edit) – 3:39
 "Suerte" (album version) – 3:14
 "Suerte" (TV edit) – 3:38
 Europe CD Maxi single (EPC 671913 2) "Whenever, Wherever" – 3:16
 "Suerte" – 3:14
 "Estoy Aquí" – 3:55
 "Tú" – 3:36
 Europe 4-track WW (672426 2) "Whenever, Wherever" – 3:16
 "Suerte (Whenever, Wherever)" – 3:14
 "Whenever, Wherever" (Tracy Young's Spin Cycle Mix) – 7:03
 "Whenever, Wherever" (video)
 WW/"Suerte" Europe (671913 7) "Whenever, Wherever" (TV edit) – 3:39
 "Suerte (Whenever, Wherever)" – 3:14
 "Estoy Aquí" – 3:52
 "Tú" – 3:36
 "Whenever, Wherever" (Tracy Young's Spin Cycle Mix) – 7:03
 "Whenever, Wherever" (Dark Side of the Moon Mix) – 7:45
 UK promo (HPCD 2617 /XPCD 2617); USA promo (ESK 16691) "Whenever, Wherever" – 3:16
 Australia promo (SAMP 2414); Brazil promo (900051/2-502605); Europe promo (SAMPCS 10588) "Whenever, Wherever" – 3:16
 "Suerte" – 3:14
 Europe promo (SAMPCS 12236) "Whenever, Wherever" (Sahara Mix) – 3:56
 "Whenever, Wherever" (Hammad Belly Dance Mix) – 3:45
 "Suerte" Argentina promo (DEP 707); "Suerte" Mexico promo (PRCD 98424) "Suerte (Whenever, Wherever)" – 3:14
 "Whenever, Wherever" – 3:16
 UK 1-track Epic promo (CD-R acetate) "Whenever, Wherever"
 US 2-track Epic promo (CD-R acetate) "Whenever, Wherever" (Tracy Young Tribal Mix) – 9:40
 "Whenever, Wherever" (Tracy Young Tribal Mix Radio Edit) – 3:15
 Australia (CD-R acetate) Tracy Young's Spin Cycle Mix – 7:02
 Acapella 121 BPM – 3:36
 Tee's Blue Dub – New Version – 7:37
 The Dark Side of the Moon Mix – 8:14
 Europe 12" vinyl (671913 6) "Whenever, Wherever" – 3:16
 "Whenever, Wherever" (Tracy Young's Spin Cycle Mix) – 7:03
 "Whenever, Wherever" (A Cappella 121 BPM) – 3:37
 "Whenever, Wherever" (Tee's Blue Dub New Version) – 7:37
 "Whenever, Wherever" (The Dark Side of the Moon Mix) – 7:45
 US 7" (ZSS79642B) (34-79642) "Whenever, Wherever"
 "Suerte (Whenever, Whenever)"
 Mexico jukebox 7" vinyl (670037) "Suerte (Whenever, Wherever)" – 3:14
 "Te Aviso, Te Anuncio (Tango)" – 3:47
 WW Europe 12" (SAMPMS ) "Whenever, Wherever" (Sahara Mix) – 3:56
 "Whenever, Wherever" (Hammad Belly Dance Mix) – 3:45
 US 4-track 12" (EAS-16691-S1) "Whenever, Wherever" (Tracy Young's Spin Cycle Mix)
 "Whenever, Wherever" (A Cappella 121 BPM)
 "Whenever, Wherever" (Tee's Blue Dub)
 "Whenever, Wherever" (The Dark Side of the Moon Mix)
 Cassette (672426 4) "Whenever, Wherever" (Album version) – 3:16
 "Suerte" (Album version) – 3:14
 "Whenever, Wherever" (The Dark Side of the Moon Mix) – 7:45

Charts
"Whenever, Wherever"

Weekly charts

Year-end charts

Decade-end charts

All-time charts

"Suerte"

Weekly charts

Year-end charts

All-time charts

Certifications and sales

|-

Release history

Kriss Kross Amsterdam and The Boy Next Door version

"Whenever'''" is a song by Kris Kross Amsterdam and The Boy Next Door released in 2018 featuring vocals by British Conor Maynard. The song was released by Virgin Records and Spinnin' Records. It is an adaptation and rearrangement of the Shakira song "Whenever, Wherever" with new lyrics and new musical compositions. The refrain samples Shakira's release. The song was a hit all over Europe and also appeared on United States Billboard'' Dance/Electronic Songs.

See also
 List of best-selling singles of the 2000s in Australia
 List of best-selling singles of the 2000s (decade) in the United Kingdom
 French Top 100 singles of the 2000s
 List of best-selling singles in France
 List of best-selling singles by year (Germany)

References

2001 songs
2001 singles
Dutch Top 40 number-one singles
European Hot 100 Singles number-one singles
Irish Singles Chart number-one singles
Latin Grammy Award for Best Short Form Music Video
Music videos directed by Francis Lawrence
Number-one singles in Australia
Number-one singles in Austria
Number-one singles in Denmark
Number-one singles in Finland
Number-one singles in Germany
Number-one singles in Greece
Number-one singles in Hungary
Number-one singles in Italy
Number-one singles in New Zealand
Number-one singles in Norway
Number-one singles in Portugal
Number-one singles in Spain
Number-one singles in Sweden
Number-one singles in Switzerland
Shakira songs
SNEP Top Singles number-one singles
Song recordings produced by Tim Mitchell
Songs written by Gloria Estefan
Songs written by Shakira
Ultratop 50 Singles (Flanders) number-one singles
Ultratop 50 Singles (Wallonia) number-one singles